English film director Alfred Hitchcock made cameo appearances in 40 of his 54 surviving major films (his second film, The Mountain Eagle, is lost). For the films in which he appeared, he would be seen for a brief moment in a non-speaking part as an extra, such as boarding a bus, crossing in front of a building, standing in an apartment across the courtyard, or even appearing in a newspaper photograph (as seen in the film Lifeboat, which otherwise provided no other opportunity for him to appear).

During the filming of The Lodger: A Story of the London Fog, Hitchcock later said his cameo came about at the last minute. The actor who was supposed to play the bit part of a telephone operator failed to show up, so Hitchcock filled in for him. This playful gesture became one of Hitchcock's trademark signatures, with fans making a sport of trying to spot his cameos. As a recurring theme, he would carry a musical instrument– especially memorable was the double bass case that he wrestles onto the train at the beginning of Strangers on a Train. In his earliest appearances, he filled in as an obscure extra in crowds or walking through scenes in long camera shots. His later appearances became more prominent, such as when he turns to see Jane Wyman's disguise as she passes him in Stage Fright, and in stark silhouette in his final film Family Plot.

His appearances became so popular that he began to make them earlier in his films so as not to distract the audience from the plot. Hitchcock confirms this in extended interviews with François Truffaut, and indeed the majority of his appearances occur within the first half-hour of his films, with over half in the first 15 minutes. 

Hitchcock's longest cameo appearances are in his British films Blackmail and Young and Innocent. He appears in all 30 features from Rebecca (his first American film) onward; before his move to Hollywood, he only occasionally performed cameos.

Cameo appearances in Hitchcock films 
This is an alphabetical list of Hitchcock's cameo appearances in films that he directed.

Other cameo appearances 
Hitchcock appeared only once in any installment of his Alfred Hitchcock Presents television show (aside from his personal introductions and closings): in the 1958 episode of the third season ("Dip in the Pool") at 5 minutes 15 seconds Hitchcock appears on the cover of a magazine one of the characters is reading.
 In the 1966 film How to Steal a Million, Nicole Bonnet (Audrey Hepburn) lies in bed reading a magazine with "Hitchcock" on the cover and his face on the back cover.
 Hitchcock's image shows up in Alain Resnais's Last Year at Marienbad, as an homage to Hitchcock's cameo appearances. 
 In Parasite, Bong Joon-Ho features a picture of Hitchcock prominently.
 Director Richard Franklin incorporates a Hitchcock cameo into Psycho II (1983), even though Hitchcock was by then dead. When Mary Samuels and Norman Bates pay an early nighttime visit to Mother's bedroom, Hitchcock's familiar silhouette can be seen in shadow on the far right wall just after they enter the room.
 In Gus Van Sant's 1998 shot-for-shot remake of Psycho, Van Sant can be seen standing next to a Hitchcock look-alike at the same point in the film as in the original.

See also
 List of cameo appearances by Stan Lee

References

External links 
 Cameo picture gallery from Filmsite.com
 A list of the cameos at Empire magazines website
 A montage of Hitchcock cameos ("supercut")
 The Hitchcock Cameos, on the Alfred Hitchcock Wiki (includes screen shots of all cameos)

Cameo Appearances
Hitchcock, Alfred
Hitchcock
Hitchcock Cameo Appearances